The dark blind snake (Epictia melanura) is a species of snake in the family Leptotyphlopidae.

References

Epictia
Reptiles described in 1943
Taxobox binomials not recognized by IUCN